The canton of Les Coteaux is an administrative division of the Hautes-Pyrénées department, southwestern France. It was created at the French canton reorganisation which came into effect in March 2015. Its seat is in Trie-sur-Baïse.

It consists of the following communes:
 
Antin
Aries-Espénan
Aubarède
Barthe
Bazordan
Bernadets-Debat
Betbèze
Betpouy
Bonnefont
Bouilh-Péreuilh
Boulin
Bugard
Cabanac
Campuzan
Castelnau-Magnoac
Castelvieilh
Castéra-Lou
Casterets
Caubous
Chelle-Debat
Cizos
Collongues
Coussan
Devèze
Dours
Estampures
Fontrailles
Fréchède
Gaussan
Gonez
Guizerix
Hachan
Hourc
Jacque
Lalanne
Lalanne-Trie
Lamarque-Rustaing
Lansac
Lapeyre
Laran
Larroque
Laslades
Lassales
Lizos
Louit
Lubret-Saint-Luc
Luby-Betmont
Lustar
Marquerie
Marseillan
Mazerolles
Monléon-Magnoac
Monlong
Mun
Oléac-Debat
Organ
Osmets
Peyret-Saint-André
Peyriguère
Pouy
Pouyastruc
Puntous
Puydarrieux
Sabalos
Sadournin
Sariac-Magnoac
Sère-Rustaing
Soréac
Souyeaux
Thermes-Magnoac
Thuy
Tournous-Darré
Trie-sur-Baïse
Vidou
Vieuzos
Villembits
Villemur

References

Cantons of Hautes-Pyrénées